Manas Air was an airline based in Bishkek in Kyrgyzstan. It was established in 2000 and ceased operations in 2001.

Fleet
Manas Air operated 1 Ilyushin Il-62 wet-leased from Quadrotour/Fenix AL and since returned. (ref: Aero Transport Data Bank)

Defunct airlines of Kyrgyzstan
Airlines established in 2000
Airlines disestablished in 2001